Fred Figglehorn (stylized as FЯED) is the central character in an Internet video series created by then-teenager Lucas Cruikshank from 2006 to 2015. It yielded other spin-off series and a relationship with Nickelodeon, including three movies and a television series.

History 
Lucas Cruikshank introduced the Fred character in a video on JKL Productions, a YouTube channel he started on YouTube with his cousins, Jon and Katie Smet on June 11, 2006. Cruikshank uploaded several videos testing out different characters. The first Fred video was uploaded on October 30, 2006. On April 30, 2008, these videos were moved to the Fred channel. On May 1 the first official video of the series, titled "Fred on May Day" was released. By April 2009, it became the first YouTube channel to have over one million subscribers.

Zipit Wireless Messenger (Z2) sponsored the first season of Fred, with several product placements. Walden Media hired Cruikshank to promote the film City of Ember, along with the sci-fi novel it was based on, cameos from the film's star Tim Robbins in Fred episodes, and a mock movie trailer.

Cruikshank made a cameo appearance as both Fred and himself on Nickelodeon's iCarly in "iMeet Fred", which originally aired on February 16, 2009. The episode has iCarly facing a huge loss of popularity after Freddie Benson criticizes Fred on-air, resulting in Cruikshank pretending to cancel his own show, and the characters organizing a crossover episode between the two web shows to regain popularity.

In December 2009, Cruikshank filmed Fred: The Movie, which aired on Nickelodeon on September 18, 2010. Nickelodeon created a franchise surrounding the character, with the sequel, Fred 2: Night of the Living Fred, airing on October 22, 2011. In 2012, Fred: The Show aired, consisting of 24 11-minute episodes; a third movie, Fred 3: Camp Fred, premiered that year.

In June 2010, Fred appeared on the Annoying Orange web series. In October and November 2011, Ari Gold cameos in Fred as Power, from the film Adventures of Power.

The last video in the Fred franchise was an appearance by Cruikshank in the video “Lucas Defeats Yuksung”, an episode of “The New Fred”. Cruikshank made one final appearance in a promo for the new era of the channel in which users could send in their own videos before selling off the channel, making few appearances from then on. The channel made its final upload in 2015.

In 2020, Cruikshank created a TikTok channel based on Fred named HeyItsFred.

Format 
Fred lives with his grandmother and his mother who is a recovering drug-addict and alcoholic stripper. Fred has been the victim of child abuse and his father is a former rock musician, and currently on death row in the state penitentiary.

The series uses a floating timeline, meaning it is always taking place in the current year, and Fred is perpetually six years old and in kindergarten. The videos primarily consist of the character speaking to the audience about what is happening in his life. Fred has a high-pitched voice and is hyperactive, achieved by speeding up the footage. Cruikshank has described the channel as "programming for kids by kids" as a parody of people who "think that everyone is so interested in them". He believes that viewers either "automatically love Fred or automatically hate Fred, there is no in between".

Leading up to the second movie's release, a new series called Figgle Chat features Internet and television stars. An animated series, It's Fred! joined the channel.

Discography

Albums

Extended plays

Charted songs

Films

Fred: The Movie 

Fred: The Movie is a 2010 film based on the YouTube series about Fred Figglehorn. It features Lucas Cruikshank as Fred, Pixie Lott as Judy, Jennette McCurdy as Bertha, Jake Weary as Kevin Cen, John Cena as Fred's imaginary dad, and Siobhan Fallon Hogan as Fred's mom. It follows the character as he tries to track down his crush, Judy after she moves away. It is written by David A. Goodman, directed by Clay Weiner, and produced by Brian Robbins. Filming began November 9, 2009, and wrapped up December 20, 2009. The movie premiered on Nickelodeon on September 18, 2010, and the DVD was released October 5, 2010 as well as streaming media such as Netflix.

Fred 2: Night of the Living Fred 

Fred 2: Night of the Living Fred is a 2011 Halloween-themed sequel to Fred: The Movie. It first aired on October 22, 2011. After Fred has broken up with Judy, he meets Kevin Cen's sister Talia, and becomes convinced that his new neighbor is a vampire. The Judy character does not appear, and Jennette McCurdy was replaced by Daniella Monet in the role of Bertha.

Fred 3: Camp Fred 

In late 2011, a third Fred movie was announced. Fred 3: Camp Fred premiered July 28, 2012, on Nickelodeon, which also aired Fred: The Show, a series of 24 11-minute-long episodes, in 2012. For summer, Fred attends Camp Iwannapeepee, where he meets several different characters, and must compete against Kevin Cen's camp.

TV series

Fred: The Show

In 2012, Fred became the protagonist in his own TV series, which ran between January and August 2012. The series received dismal reviews, particularly for Fred's annoying attitude, and grating voice, and ratings continued to slip until the show was axed, after which Cruikshank severed ties with Nickelodeon, and Fred was retired.

References

External links 
 
 
 
 

2006 web series debuts
2011 web series endings
Figglehorn, Fred
Fictional characters from Nebraska
Internet memes introduced in 2006
Figglehorn, Fred
Viral videos
YouTube channels closed in 2015
YouTube channels launched in 2006
Number-one YouTube channels in subscribers